Tathagata Roy (born 14 September 1945) is an Indian politician who served as the Governor of Tripura from 2015 to 2018 and the Governor of Meghalaya from August 2018 to the end of his term in August 2020. He was the 6th president of West Bengal state unit of Bharatiya Janata Party from 2002 to 2006 and a member of the BJP National Executive from 2002 until 2015.

Roy briefly had additional charge of the office of the Governor of Arunachal Pradesh from July 2016 till August 2016, during which he handled the ouster of Chief Minister Kalikho Pul following a Supreme Court judgement, and swore in Pema Khandu as the new Chief Minister. An engineer by training, Roy is a former professor of construction engineering and the founder-head of the department at Jadavpur University.

Life and works 
Tathagata Roy was born on 14 September 1945 in Calcutta, British India to Debesh Chandra Roy and Anila (née Dutta). He had a distinguished academic career, having been ranked 6th in the Higher secondary examination of West Bengal Board of Secondary Education as a student of St. Lawrence High School, Kolkata and a recipient of the Jagadis Bose National Science Talent Search Scholarship. He studied Civil Engineering in Bengal Engineering College Sibpur (currently Indian Institute of Engineering Science and Technology, Shibpur), when it was affiliated with the University of Calcutta. Later he joined Indian Railways Service of Engineers. He worked as General Manager, RITES and as Chief Engineer - Design of Metro Railways, Calcutta.  He also holds a Law Degree of Calcutta University.

Roy took voluntary retirement from the Railways in 1990. He then joined Jadavpur University as professor and founder head of the Department of Construction Engineering at its new campus at Salt Lake, Calcutta. He is a former Chairman Board of Governors of TTTI Calcutta (2000 to 2005). He is a fellow of the Institution of Engineers and life member of the Indian Council of Arbitration. He functioned as an arbitrator in a number of engineering contracts until he was appointed Governor of Tripura.

Roy was felicitated as an 'Eminent Engineering Personality' by the Institution of Engineers (India) at the Engineering Congress held at Guwahati in December 2015 and awarded the distinguished Alumni award by Indian Institute of Engineering Science and Technology, Shibpur, formerly Bengal Engineering College Sibpur during the Second Annual Convocation of the institute on 4 March 2016. He was also conferred the degree of Doctor of Letters (Honoris Causa) by the Shri Jagdishprasad Jhabarmull Tibrewala University, Vidyanagari, Jhunjhunu, Rajasthan, at a special convocation at Mumbai in May 2016. He was further conferred the degree of Doctor of Engineering (Honoris Causa) by the National Institute of Technology, Agartala, Tripura, at the convocation in November 2016.

Politics 
Roy was attracted towards Hindutva, the ideology of Hindu nationalism and joined the Rashtriya Swayamsevak Sangh (RSS) in 1986. After leaving government service he joined the BJP in 1990. He replaced Ashim Ghosh as president of the West Bengal state unit of the BJP in 2002 and was succeeded by Sukumar Banerjee in 2006.

Roy stood as a candidate for election to the Lok Sabha in 2009, standing in the North Kolkata constituency of West Bengal. He did not win. He stood as the BJP candidate in the Kolkata Dakshin (South Kolkata) parliamentary constituency for the 2014 Indian general election, earning 25.29% of the total votes polled. He was appointed Governor of Tripura on 12 May 2015. He was transferred and appointed Governor of Meghalaya in August 2018. He served till December 2019 and, after a brief medical leave, again from January 2020 until 18 August 2020 completing his five-year tenure on gubernatorial post, handing over the charge to Satya Pal Malik.

Publications 
Roy writes extensively, mostly socio-political articles, both in English and in his native Bengali. He has been published in The Statesman, BJP Today, Desh (Bengali fortnightly) and several others. He has authored seven books:

Bampontha Bhayankari: Banglay o Bideshe (Bengali) (Mitra & Ghosh, Kolkata, 2020)
 Bharatkeshari Yugpurush Syamaprasad (Bengali) (Mitra & Ghosh, Kolkata, 2018)
Ja Chhilo Amar Desh (Bengali) (Mitra & Ghosh, Kolkata, 2016)
My People, Uprooted: The Exodus of Hindus from East Pakistan and Bangladesh (Synergy Books India, New Delhi, 2016), earlier published under the title A Suppressed Chapter in History: The Exodus of Hindus from East Pakistan and Bangladesh, 1947-2006, (Bookwell, Delhi, 2007)
"Syama Prasad Mookerjee: Life and Times", (Penguin/Viking, Delhi, 2018), earlier published under title The Life and Times of Dr. Syama Prasad Mookerjee, (Prabhat Prakashan, Delhi, 2012). Also translated into Hindi under title Apratim Nayak Dr. Syama Prasad Mookerjee (Prabhat Prakashan, Delhi, 2012)
 Tathagata Rayer Nirbachito Probondho Songroho (Bengali), Vivekananda Sahitya Kendra, Kolkata, 2008
Engineering Contracts in India: Law, Practice and Management, (Bharat Book Agency, Calcutta, 1990)

Family 
Roy is the elder brother of Saugata Roy, the All India Trinamool Congress MP and former Minister of State for Urban Development. He is married to Anuradha, who taught English at B.K.C. College, Kolkata. They have two daughters, Malini (Roy) and Madhura (Khedekar), both of whom are married and  live in the United States.

References

|-

|-

|-

|-

External links
 

1945 births
Living people
Engineers from West Bengal
Indian civil engineers
Indian Hindus
University of Calcutta alumni
Academic staff of Jadavpur University
National Democratic Alliance candidates in the 2014 Indian general election
Governors of Meghalaya
Governors of Tripura
Governors of Arunachal Pradesh
Bharatiya Janata Party politicians from West Bengal